This is a list of windmills in  Bouches-du-Rhône, France.

LAMBESC
Moulin de Bertoire
Moulin Tour

The towermill of Bertoire (13410 – Lambesc) mill built of local stone (between 1795 et 1810), with a vaulted ground floor to support the first floor and two rotating wheels and recumbent.
It is located near the sports park, opposite the shopping center "Calypso"

The Association "Conservation patrimoine de Lambesc" has been founded in October 2009, which first project is to add wings to mill and grind wheat; then, the tower will become windmill.
City of Lambesc, proprietary of this windmill since 1981, gave in November 2010, authorization to this project, contracting with Association "Conservation patrimoine de Lambesc". conservationpatrimoinelambesc-hotmail-fr.

Association "Conservation patrimoine de Lambesc" has contracted, in December 2010 with the "fondation du Patrimoine"(heritage foundation in France), to launch a public subscription starting in January 2011.
Page de Soutien au Projet de restauration du Moulin de Bertoire

Since April 2011, work began: disbursement around the windmill, extracting the stone quarry in Lambesc of 40 coping stones followed by the size of the 40 stones in the stone-cutter's workshop), installation of scaffolding, raising of the tower wall to original height, 40 Laying coping stones.

External links
French windmills website
French heritage foundation website 
French Heritage Foundation supports projects to restore windmills with fundraising financial (tax-free) for the French public. 'la Fondation du Patrimoine organise des souscriptions de mécénat populaire.

Windmills in France
Buildings and structures in Bouches-du-Rhône